Ellen V. Sigal, Ph.D., is the founder and chairperson of Friends of Cancer Research, a non-profit organization based in the Washington, DC metropolitan area.

References

 AACR Applauds Appointment of Ellen V. Sigal, PH.D. to the Patient-centered Outcomes Research Institute Board of Governors. States News Service. September 24, 2010.
 

Women nonprofit executives